Edward Austen Knight (born Edward Austen; 7 October 1767 – 19 November 1852) was the third eldest brother of Jane Austen, and provided her with the use of a cottage in Chawton where she lived for the last years of her life (now Jane Austen's House Museum).  He was also High Sheriff of Kent in 1801.

Family
Edward was born in Deane, Hampshire, the third of eight children born to Rev. George Austen and Cassandra Leigh.  He had five brothers: James (1765–1819), George (1766–1838), Henry Thomas (1771–1850), Francis William (Frank) (1774–1865), Charles John (1779–1852), and two sisters, Cassandra and Jane Austen.

He married Elizabeth Bridges (1773–1808) on 27 December 1791, and together they had eleven children:
 Fanny Catherine (1793–1882) (one of Jane Austen's favourite nieces)
 Edward (1794–1879)
 George Thomas (1795–1867)
 Henry (1796–1843)
 Reverend William (1798–1873)
 Elizabeth (1800–1884), who married Edward Royd Rice
 Marianne (1801–1896)
 Charles (1803–1867)
 Louisa (1804–1889), second wife of Lord George Hill
 Cassandra Jane (1806–1842), first wife of Lord George Hill
 Brook John (1808–1878)

Knight inheritance

When Edward was twelve years old he was presented to Thomas and Catherine Knight, who were relatives of his father and were wealthy. Thomas had given George Austen the living at Steventon in 1761. They were childless and took an interest in Edward, making him their legal heir in about 1783.

The Knights paid for Edward to go on a Grand Tour when he was 18 years old, and he recorded many of his experiences in his Journals. These have been edited by Jon Hunter Spence and published by the Jane Austen Society of Australia in 2004.

When Thomas died in 1794 he left the Godmersham Park estate to his wife for her life, with the remainder going to Edward.  She left Godmersham before her death to move to Canterbury, and gave up the estates to Edward.

Edward inherited three estates from Thomas Knight, in Steventon, Chawton and Godmersham (which included a manor at Wittersham).  The libraries from these estates were used extensively by Jane Austen. When war broke out with France, Edward raised and was appointed Captain of the Godmersham and Molash Company of the East Kent Volunteers.

In 1812 due to a stipulation in Catherine Knight's will, he changed his legal name to Knight.

Estates
The rectory at Steventon, where the Austen family had spent their time growing up, and Jane is said to have written the first drafts of several of her books, was severely damaged by flooding and was knocked down by Edward in about 1823,
and a new rectory was built by Edward for his son, William Knight, who had taken on the living.

Edward made several improvements to Chawton House, including planting a walled garden, and forming new parkland to take advantage of the views from the house.

References

External links
Edward's silk coat:
  BBC History

Link to portrait:
 Art Finder

1767 births
1852 deaths
Austen family
People from Steventon, Hampshire
High Sheriffs of Kent
People from Chawton
People from Godmersham
People from Deane, Hampshire